This is a list of educational institutions in the district of Faisalabad in the Pakistani province of Punjab.

Professional training institutes 

 BirdView Logic Academy (Software House and IT Training), Faisalabad

First category institutes 
 Students’ Inn College
 The Punjab School Faisalabad
 Iqra International Institute Faisalabad
 The Skylark Academy system Faisalabad (campus)
 STEM Visions Faisalabad
 Leads School System Faisalabad
 Angels International College 
 Chiniot Islamia School
 Beaconhouse School System
 Govt. Comprehensive Higher Secondary School Samanabad Faisalabad
 Govt. M.C. High School Samanabad Faisalabad
 Punjab Medical College
 Aziz Fatimah Medical and Dental College
 Divisional Public School & College
 Punjab Group of Colleges
 White Rose School System
 Divisional Model College
 Government College University
 University of Agriculture
 Institute of Engineering & Fertilizer Research
 Global Science Academy Faisalabad
 Roots IVY School & College
 The City School

Higher education 
 NFC Institute of Engineering and Fertilizer Research (NFC-IEFR)
 National University of Modern Languages (NUML)
 University of Sargodha, Lyallpur Campus, Faisalabad
 University of Engineering and Technology, Lahore: Faisalabad campus
 Riphah International University Faisalabad
 University of Agriculture, Faisalabad
 Punjab Medical College / Faisalabad Medical University
 Aziz Fatimah Medical and Dental College
 Government College University, Faisalabad
Government College Women University (Faisalabad)
 National Textile University
 University of Faisalabad
 Independent Medical College, Faisalabad
 SKANS School of Accountancy
 Punjab Law College
 Allama Iqbal Open University
 Hamdard University, Faisalabad
 Preston University
 University of Education
 Virtual University
 Institute of Cost and Management Accountants of Pakistan (ICMAP)
 Institute of Chartered Accountants of Pakistan (ICAP)
 Pakistan Institute of Public Finance Accountants (PIPFA)
 College of Physicians and Surgeons of Pakistan (CPSP)
 University of Central Punjab
 National University of Computer & Emerging Sciences Chiniot - Faisalabad Campus (FAST NU - NUCES)
 University Community College, GCUF
 Govt. College of Commerce, Abdullah Pur, Faisalabad
 TMUC (The Millennium Universal College Faisalabad)

Colleges 
 Government Degree College for Women Samanabad,Faisalabad
 Government Postgraduate College Samanabad Faisalabad
 Faisalabad College for Women Samanabad Faisalabad (Westfield Campus) 
 Cadet College Faisalabad
 Divisional Public School & College
 Government College of Technology
 Government Post Graduate College of Commerce, Peoples Colony Faisalabad
 Government Post Graduate Islamia College Faisalabad
 Government Postgraduate College Of Science Samanabad Faisalabad
 Jpi group of colleges Samundari road, fsd
 KIPS College
 Oxley College of Science
 Punjab College of Science
 SAHA Group of Colleges
 Shiblee Group of Colleges
 Students’ Inn College
 Summit Group of colleges
 Superior College
 Tips college
 Chenab Group Of Colleges
 Dar-ul-Madinah College, near Zainab Masjid Muhammadia Colony, Susan Road, Madinah Town, Faisalabad

Schools 
 Chenab Group of Schools & Colleges, Gulshan-e-Hayyat, Fsd
 Ace School System, Lasani Town, Faisalabad
Shiblee Grammar School System 
 Al-Bahadar Public High School, 229-RB, Makuana, Faisalabad
 Allied Schools System Sarghodha Road campus
 Beaconhouse School System, Gulshan-e-Iqbal
 Brilliant School System, Bhatta stop Jhang Road, Faisalabad
 Usama Bin Zaid Public High School
 Chiniot Islamia School
 Convent of Jesus and Mary
 Dar-e-Arqam Schools
 Divisional Public School Faisalabad
EFA School System Ideal campus
 Faisalabad Cadet Schools
 Government Comprehensive Boys High School, Samanabad
 Government High School for Boys, Salarwala
 Govt. M.C. High School Samanabad Faisalabad
 The Grace School System
 Happy Home School System
 Imtiaz Grammar Girls Secondary School, Faisalabad
 Iqra International Institute Faisalabad, Doctors City
 Kamil Foundation Secondary School, Jinnah Colony, Faisalabad
 Govt Islamia Higher Secondary School 202r.b Gatti, Faisalabad
 Lahore Grammar School
 La Salle High School Faisalabad
 LEADS School System Faisalabad
 Lee Rosary School, Al-Fayyaz Colony, Satiana Road, Faisalabad 
 Millat Grammar School
 Punjab Science School, Kaleem Shaheed Colony #1, Faisalabad
 The Right Way School System Liaqatabad No.1 Faisalabad
 Sandal College, Faisalabad
 St. Joseph's Technical Institute, Faisalabad
 St. Peter's High School
 The Spirit School (chain)
 Tahir Model High School & college 
 White Rose School System, Faisalabad
 The Classic School, Faisalabad

Special needs 
According to the Government of Punjab website.
 Tanzeem Al Lisan	                Eid Bagh, Dhobi Ghat, Faisalabad 
 Al Faisal Markaz Nabina	        Civil Line Faisalabad
 Pakistan Association of the Blind	Faisalabad
 Mentally Retarded Children	        Millat Town Faisalabad
 Government Girls Higher Secondary School for (H.I)	24-A Peoples Colony Faisalabad
 Government Institute for the Blind	W-Block Madina Town Faisalabad
 Government Special Education Center for Mentally Retarded Children	P-863-B-Block Amin Town Canal Road Faisalabad
 Government Institute for Slow Learner	153-B Peoples Colony Muslim Park Faisalabad
 Government Special Education Center	Iqbal Town, House No. 5 Ghulam Rasool Nagar Near Fowara Chowk Faisalabad
 Government Special Education Center	Lyall Pur Town, P-82 Muslim Town "B" Sargodha Road Faisalabad
 Government Special Education Center	Jinnah Town, 440-A Ghulam Muhammad Abad Faisalabad
 National Special Education Center	Millat Town Faisalabad
 Government Boys Higher Secondary School for (H.I)	Jaranwala Road Faisalabad
 Government Special Education Center	Adjacent Stadium Jaranwala
 Government Special Education Center	Near Government Elementary School No. 5, Canal Road Tandlianwala
 Government Special Education Center	471-More Ashraf Abad Sammundri
 Government Special Education Center	17-A Mohallah Aslam Abad, Khurrianwala Road Chak Jhumra
 Eilya Care Home 24-Y-J, Madina Town, Faisalabad.
 Al Muslim Girls High School Chak No. 202/RB Bhaiwala, Faisalabad.

References 

 01
 01
 01
Faisalabad-related lists
Faisalabad
Faisalabad